Macbecin belongs to the ansamycin family of antibiotics and was first isolated from actinomycete bacteria. Macbecin possesses potent antitumor properties. In-vitro studies have shown that Macbecin is effective in the eradication of Gram-positive bacteria, fungi, and protozoa including Tetrahymena pyriformis.

Structure
Macbecin has an unusual macrocyclic lactam structure.  There are two variants Macbecin I and II which correspond to the oxidized 1,4-benzoquinone and reduced hydroquinone respectively.

Mechanism of action
Macbecins mechanism of action is in part due to heat shock protein Hsp90 protein inhibition.

References

External links
 
 

Ansamycins
Carbamates
1,4-Benzoquinones
Lactams
Ethers
B